The Treviglio–Cremona railway is a railway line in Lombardy, Italy.

History 
The line was planned in the last years of the Austrian domination of Lombardy, and opened in 1863 after the Second Italian War of Independence.

It was electrified in 1977.

See also 
 List of railway lines in Italy

References

Footnotes

Sources
 
 
  

Railway lines in Lombardy
Railway lines opened in 1863
Cremona